Jiangnan District is one of seven districts of the prefecture-level city of Nanning, the capital of Guangxi Zhuang Autonomous Region, South China.

Administrative divisions
There are four subdistricts and four towns in the district:

Subdistricts:
Jiangnan Subdistrict (江南街道), Fujianyuan Subdistrict (福建园街道), Shajing Subdistrict (沙井街道), Nahong Subdistrict (那洪街道)

Towns:
Jiangxi (江西镇), Wuxu (吴圩镇), Suxu (苏圩镇), Yan'an (延安镇)

References

External links

County-level divisions of Guangxi
Nanning